Conor Chinn (born August 29, 1987 in La Jolla, California) is a former American soccer player.

Career

College and amateur
Chinn first gained notoriety in high school, when he was featured in nationally aired commercials for StarKick.  Following high school, Chinn attended Seattle University for one year before transferring to the University of San Francisco, where he played from 2006 to 2009.  At San Francisco, he appeared in 78 games, scoring 37 goals and adding 12 assists.

During his college years, Chinn also played in the USL Premier Development League for Orange County Blue Star.

Professional
Chinn was drafted in the third round (34th overall) of the 2010 MLS SuperDraft by New York Red Bulls. He made his professional debut on April 3, 2010, as a late substitute in a game against Seattle Sounders FC.

On April 27, 2010 Chinn scored his first two goals for New York in a 2-1 victory over Philadelphia Union in a 2010 Lamar Hunt U.S. Open Cup qualification match. On May 23, 2010 Chinn scored New York's second goal in a 3-1 victory over Italian side Juventus FC in a friendly played at Red Bull Arena.

Chinn was waived by New York on March 1, 2011, having played in 5 MLS games for the team. He was then signed by Real Salt Lake on March 24, 2011, but was waived by RSL on May 27, 2011, having never made an MLS appearance for the team.

Chinn signed with the Atlanta Silverbacks of the North American Soccer League on June 10, 2011.

Chinn signed with USL Pro club Rochester Rhinos on December 19, 2011.

Career statistics

References

External links
USF bio

1987 births
Living people
American soccer players
San Francisco Dons men's soccer players
Orange County Blue Star players
New York Red Bulls players
Real Salt Lake players
Atlanta Silverbacks players
Rochester New York FC players
USL League Two players
Major League Soccer players
North American Soccer League players
Soccer players from California
New York Red Bulls draft picks
Association football forwards